Alvaston Moor Academy, formerly known as Merrill College and Merrill Academy, is a secondary school for students aged 11–16 years, located in Alvaston, Derby, England.

Senior leadership team
Mrs M Strong - Principal

Curriculum
Alvaston Moor Academy provides education for pupils of ages 11–16 years.

References
Staff List
Curriculum

External links
School and College (Post-16) Achievement and Attainment Tables 2006

Secondary schools in Derby
Academies in Derby